Mediaite is a news website focusing on politics and the media. Founded by Dan Abrams, it is part of the Abrams Media Network.

Content
The website focuses on politics and the media. The New York Times has described the site as "a blog that chronicles the gossipy media world" and The Washington Post describes it as focusing on "the intersection of media and politics".

History
Mediaite was founded by Dan Abrams in mid-2009. Its writers have included Noah Rothman, Philip Bump, Joe Concha, and Tina Nguyen.

For the month of January 2017, Mediaite reached 11.86 million unique visitors, which Abrams credited to the presidency of Donald Trump's relationship with the news media. 

In June 2019, Mediaite, along with sister site Law & Crime, left-leaning Raw Story and AlterNet, and conservative sites The Daily Caller and Washington Free Beacon, formed a coalition of political news sites to offer marketers advertising packages aimed at readers interested in politics. The Alliance aims to attract ad revenue toward "midsized political publishers" as opposed to larger technology companies, such as Facebook and Google. 

Every December, Mediaite publishes an annual list of the 75 most influential people in news media.

References

External links
 

Internet properties established in 2009
2009 establishments in the United States
American news websites